Taourga (تاورقة Arabic, Berber ⵜⴰⵡⴻⵔⴳⴰ) is a town and commune in the Baghlia District of Boumerdès Province, Algeria. According to the 1998 census it has a population of 7,303.

Name
The name of the commute is of Berber origin and means "anthill".

History

French conquest

 Shipwreck of Dellys (15 May 1830), commanded by Captain Armand Joseph Bruat (1796-1855) and Captain Félix-Ariel d'Assigny (1794-1846).
 First Battle of the Issers (27 May 1837), commanded by General Alexandre Charles Perrégaux (1791-1837) and Colonel Maximilien Joseph Schauenburg (1784-1838).
 First Assault of Dellys (28 May 1837), commanded by Captain Félix-Ariel d'Assigny (1794-1846).
 Second Assault of Dellys (12 May 1844), commanded by General Thomas Robert Bugeaud (1784–1849).

Algerian Revolution

Geography
The town is almost mountainous terrain. The town includes the following villages: Beni Attar El Djemaa, Bouhbachou, Boudchicha, Tingrine Ain-El-Kodia, Mazer, Laghdaïr, Wadi Farms and H'lal north on the road to Dellys.

Algeria Post
The postal code of Taourga has gone through several stages since the colonial era to the present.
Before the administrative division of Algeria in 1984, the postal code was 15000 But after this, Taourga was attached to the wilaya of Boumerdes bearing number 35. Therefore, the postal code of Taourga taken to the generic digital form 351xxx five digits. Finally, the city received Taourga number 0 giving the postal code 35140.

But in 2008, Taourga received a new postal code of 350 294.

Water supplies
This town has several small dams and a seawater desalination plant as well as several boreholes and wells. This town is crossed by several wadis:
 Dam Thénia 30 000 m3.
 Dam of El Merdjet Feïat: 50 000 m3.
 Dam of El Allal: 60,000 m3
 Dam Chender: 1700000 m3.
 Dam Djinet: 2800000 m3.
 Dam Sidi Daoud: 3700000 m3
 Beni Amrane Dam: 13.1 million m3.
 Dam Hamiz: 16,280,000 m3.
 Keddara dam Bouzegza: 145,600,000 m3.
 Barrage Oued Djemaa: 176 000 000 M3

The town is serviced by Tala Hydroelectric Power Station Ouranim.

History
 
During antiquity and the early Middle Ages, Tigisis was located near present-day Taourga. It was ruled by the Romans, Vandals, and Byzantines before falling into obscurity during the Muslim conquest of the area.

In January 1985, Taourga was raised to the commune level. It had been a village administratively connected to the town of Baghlia, located a dozen kilometers to the west.

Economy

Various types of farms out there. The town is famous for its olive oil, mountain agriculture is practiced. The town is well known for its viticulture producing Cardinal (Red Grape),  Dattier grapes, Dabouki (Sabel), Saltana, Muscat grape, Red globe grape, and  Victoria grape, as well as Hmar bou Amar and Chasselas grapes.

Notable people

 Rezki Zerarti, Algerian artist.
 , Algerian footballer.

References

Communes of Boumerdès Province
Cities in Algeria
Algeria